"Come On Back" is a song written and recorded by American country music artist Carlene Carter.  It was released in September 1990 as the second single from her album I Fell in Love. The song reached number 3 on the Billboard Hot Country Singles & Tracks chart in January 1991.

Chart performance

Year-end charts

References

1990 singles
Carlene Carter songs
Songs written by Carlene Carter
Song recordings produced by Howie Epstein
Reprise Records singles
1990 songs